The Plaine Morte Glacier (lit.: Dead Plain Glacier) is a glacier located at an elevation of , in the canton of Bern above Lenk and in the Valais above Crans-Montana
in Switzerland. Its largest tongue is also called in German Rezligletscher or Rätzligletscher.

The area of Plaine Morte is easily accessible from Crans-Montana by cable car and the practice of cross-country skiing is possible throughout the year. The summit of the Pointe de la Plaine Morte offers impressive views of the Valais Alps.

A large lake formed at the eastern base of the glacier, south of the Schneehorn, at a height of 2,752 metres above sea level. The surface area of the lake is 0.11 km².

Panorama

See also
List of glaciers in Switzerland
List of glaciers
Retreat of glaciers since 1850
Swiss Alps

References

Tourist attractions in Switzerland
Glaciers of the Alps
Glaciers of Valais
Glaciers of the canton of Bern
GPlaineMorte